Magoroto is an administrative ward in Muheza District of Tanga Region in Tanzania. 
According to the 2012 census, the ward has a total population of 5,769.

References

Wards of Tanga Region